YMC Entertainment was a South Korean entertainment company established in 2010 by Cho Yoo-myung, the eldest son of trot singer Tae Jin-ah.

The company has been home to artists such as Shin Bo-ra, Kassy and Soulights, as well as actresses including Kim Ji-ah.

In 2015, Dream T Entertainment became a majority shareholder of YMC having acquired 80% percent of the entire company.

Former artists
 Mighty Mouth (2012-2015)
 Wheesung (2012-2016)
 Baechigi (2012–2017)
 Sugar Bowl (2014–2015)
 Lucky J (2014–2016)
 J-Yo (2014–2016)
 J'Kyun (2014–2016)
 Jessi (2014-2018)
 Joohee (2015–2016)
 Baekchan (2015–2016)
 I.O.I (2016–2017)
 Lim Na-young (2016–2017)
 Kim Chung-ha (2016–2017)
 Kim Se-jeong (2016–2017)
 Jung Chae-yeon (2016–2017)
 Zhou Jieqiong (2016–2017)
 Kim So-hye (2016–2017)
 Yoo Yeon-jung (2016–2017)
 Choi Yoo-jung (2016–2017)
 Kang Mi-na (2016–2017)
 Kim Do-yeon (2016–2017)
 Jeon So-mi (2016–2017)
 Wanna One (2017–2018)
 Yoon Ji-sung (2017–2018)
 Ha Sung-woon (2017–2018)
 Hwang Min-hyun (2017–2018)
 Ong Seong-wu (2017–2018)
 Kim Jae-hwan (2017–2018)
 Kang Daniel (2017–2018)
 Park Ji-hoon (2017–2018)
 Park Woo-jin (2017–2018)
 Bae Jin-young (2017–2018)
 Lee Dae-hwi (2017–2018)
 Lai Kuan-lin (2017–2018)
 Ailee (2010–2019)
 Kassy (co-managed with Nextar Entertainment)
 Soulights
 Shin Bo-ra

References

External links
 

K-pop record labels
South Korean record labels
Talent agencies of South Korea
Entertainment companies established in 2010
Record labels established in 2010
Defunct record labels of South Korea
Itaewon